Marie Christine Chilver, known as Christine, (12 September 1920– 5 November 2007), also known by the codename Agent Fifi, was a British secret agent in World War II. Originally recruited after escaping the Nazis and helping a British airman return to England, she worked for the Special Operations Executive (SOE) assessing and testing the security awareness of trainee secret agents.

Early life 
Chilver was born in London, England, to an English father, a correspondent for The Times of London, and okj ,mhj Latvian mother. Raised in Latkmvia,
  she was educated at a German school in Riga before moving to Paris, France, to sugnli had defeated it?|date=February 2017}} she was interned in the Frontstalag 142 internment camp at Besançon. She escaped and reached England in 1941, helping a wounded RAF officer during her journey. Meanwhile her mother and sister had fled to Sweden from Soviet-occupied Latvia, where their property had been confiscated by the Russians. The pilot, flight lieutenant Simpson, suspected Chilver was a foreign spy, as she seemed too well fed when they met. His suspicions were found to be unsubstantiated, but Chilver had already come to the notice of British authorities.

Special Operations Executive 

In 1942, Chilver joined the SOE, and was given the task of assessing and testing the security awareness of trainee agents while they were on 96-hour training missions in the UK. Her code name was "Fifi", and she had a cover identity of Christine Collard. It was rumoured that the SOE employed agents who would attempt to seduce men to persuade them to reveal their secrets; Chilvers reports show that flattery and attention were all that some trainee agents needed for them to reveal everything they knew. As a result of her reports, agents were sacked from SOE.

Her wartime documents were declassified and released by the National Archives in 2014.

Retirement 
After leaving the SOE, Chilver lived in Chelsea. While in Chelsea, she studied French at Birkbeck College, London, graduating from there with First Class Honours in French in 1960. Later she moved to the Wye Valley, living in Lydney, Gloucestershire.  She spent much of her retirement with her friend, the widowed Jean "Alex" Felgate, a retired SOE intelligence officer.  Chilver founded Dzīvnieku Draugs ("Animal Friends") in Latvia, an animal charity and sanctuary.  She died on 5 November 2007.

References

Bibliography
  (Latvian)

External links 
 Marie Christine Chilver - born 12.09.1920 at the National Archives
 Life in Pictures of the Secret Agent Seductress at the Daily Telegraph, 21 September 2014, by Anita Singh, and Rayyan Sabet-Parry
 Dzīvnieku Draugs (also available in Latvian, Russian and Finnish)

British Special Operations Executive personnel
1920 births
2007 deaths
English people of Latvian descent